Cochrane (also known as Cochrane North and Cochrane—Superior) was a federal electoral district in the province of Ontario, Canada. It was represented in the House of Commons of Canada from 1935 to 1997.

Electoral district

This riding was created in 1933 as "Cochrane" from parts of Timiskaming North riding. 
The electoral district was abolished in 1996 when it was redistributed between Algoma, Kenora—Rainy River, Thunder Bay—Nipigon,  Timiskaming—Cochrane and Timmins—James Bay ridings.

Geography

It initially consisted of the northern part of the territorial district of Timiskaming, and the eastern part of the territorial district of Cochrane and the district of Patricia. In Timiskaming, the riding included the part of the district lying north of and including the townships of Pontiac and Keefer and the townships in between them. In Cochrane, it included the part of the district lying east of a line drawn along the eastern boundaries of the townships of McCoig and Mulloy and north to the northern limit of the district. In Patricia, it included the part lying east of the projection north of the western boundary of the electoral district of Cochrane.

In 1947, it was redefined to consist of the northern part of the territorial district of Cochrane and the eastern part of the district of Patricia. In the 1960s, it was redefined to consist of the northern parts of the territorial district of Algoma, Cochrane, Kenora (Patricia Portion), Sudbury and Timiskaming.

The electoral district was abolished in 1976 when it was redistributed between Algoma, Cochrane North, Timiskaming and Timmins—Chapleau ridings.

"Cochrane North" was formed in 1976 from parts of Cochrane and Thunder Bay ridings. It consisted of the northern part of the Territorial District of Algoma, northwest part of the Territorial District of Cochrane, the eastern part of the Territorial District of Kenora (Patricia Portion), and the southeast part of the Territorial District of Thunder Bay. The name of the electoral district was changed in 1977 to "Cochrane", and in 1980 to "Cochrane—Superior".

Cochrane—Superior initially consisted of the northern part of the Territorial District of Algoma, the north-west of the Territorial District of Cochrane, the eastern part of the Territorial District of Kenora (Patricia Portion), and the south-east part of the Territorial District of Thunder Bay.

It was redefined in 1987 to consist of the north-east part of the Territorial District of Algoma, the north-west part of the Territorial District of Cochrane, the eastern part of the Territorial District of Kenora, and the eastern part of the Territorial District of Thunder Bay.

Members of Parliament

This riding has elected the following Members of Parliament:

Election results

Cochrane

|Farmer–Labour
|W. Garth Teeple 
|align="right"|  3,922

Cochrane North

Cochrane—Superior

See also 

 List of Canadian federal electoral districts
 Past Canadian electoral districts

External links 
Riding history for Cochrane 1935-1976 from the Library of Parliament
Riding history for Cochrane-North 1976-1977 from the Library of Parliament
Riding history for Cochrane 1977-1980 from the Library of Parliament
Riding history for Cochrane-Superior 1980-1997 from the Library of Parliament

Former federal electoral districts of Ontario